Aneflus longissimus is a species of beetle in the family Cerambycidae. It was described by Bates in 1885.

The larvae of this bettle usually dwell inside wood, and they can cause damage to logs and other wooden materials.

References

Aneflus
Beetles described in 1885